The Cranbourne meteorite is an octahedrite iron meteorite. It is the second largest meteorite found in Australia after the Mundrabilla meteorite, but at the time of discovery it was the largest known iron meteorite in the world. It is classified as a main group IAB meteorite.

Discovery

Of the 13 fragments that have so far been found, the largest mass, the Bruce Meteorite (Cranbourne 1), was found on the land of a cattle grazier by the name of McKay.  It is believed he had known about the mass since he moved into the area, now Devon Meadows, in 1836. McKay told of how years previously, natives of the Bunurong aboriginal tribe used to "dance around the meteorite, beating their stone tomahawks against it, and apparently much pleased with the metallic sound thus produced".  A fragment of the Bruce Meteorite, that had been made into a horse shoe had been displayed at an exhibition in Melbourne in 1854, but at that time it was not known they were meteoric in origin.

Both Cranbourne 1 and 2 were first recognized as meteoric in 1860 when the Melbourne Town Clerk, Edmund Gerald FitzGibbon, an amateur geologist, visited the sites of both the Bruce and Abel fragments.  Then in 1861, renowned German meteorologist Georg von Neumayer and some other scientists visited the sites and performed scientific experiments on them, thus confirming their meteoric origin.

Cranbourne 1, the Bruce Meteorite, was purchased by a neighbour of McKay, on whose land it had fallen, named James Bruce. Bruce wished to donate it to the British Museum, and so arranged with Ferdinand von Mueller to have it transported to The University of Melbourne to have it exhibited before its long journey to London.  While it was being held here, petitions were made by members of Melbourne's Royal Society of Victoria to have it retained in the colony.  Eventually it was agreed to have it sent to the British Museum in exchange for the Abel Meteorite, which had been sent to England in 1861.  In 1865, the Bruce meteorite arrived in the British Museum; it can currently be found on public display in the Natural History Museum in London.

Cranbourne 2, the Abel Meteorite, was found on land belonging to a Mr Lineham. It was purchased by a Ballarat mineralogist named August Theodore Abel, who had accompanied Von Neuymayer to the sites in 1861. The same year, Abel sold the fragment to the British Museum in London for 300 pounds, before it was returned to the National History Museum in Melbourne in 1865. It is now currently on display in the Melbourne Museum.  

Cranbourne 3 was found in 1860. It had been found by a farmhand around 1857 and used as an andiron. It was later lost in shipping.

Cranbourne 13 was discovered in 2008 in Clyde, not far from the location of the Abel Iron.  It was found by a market gardener who dug up the rock and was about to dispose of it before an acquaintance encouraged him to have it tested.

Replicas
Replicas of some of the fragments could for many years be seen in "Meteorite park" in Cranbourne.  However, the display has since been removed.

The following table lists all the fragments of the Cranbourne meteorite:

References

See also
 Glossary of meteoritics
 

Iron meteorites
Meteorites found in Australia